In geometry, there are seven uniform and uniform dual polyhedra named as ditrigonal.

Ditrigonal vertex figures
There are five uniform ditrigonal polyhedra, all with icosahedral symmetry.

The three uniform star polyhedron with Wythoff symbol of the form 3 | p q or  | p q are ditrigonal, at least if p and q are not 2. Each polyhedron includes two types of faces, being of triangles, pentagons, or pentagrams. Their vertex configurations are of the form p.q.p.q.p.q or (p.q)3 with a symmetry of order 3. Here, term ditrigonal refers to a hexagon having a symmetry of order 3 (triangular symmetry) acting with 2 rotational orbits on the 6 angles of the vertex figure (the word ditrigonal means "having two sets of 3 angles").

Other uniform ditrigonal polyhedra
The small ditrigonal dodecicosidodecahedron and the great ditrigonal dodecicosidodecahedron are also uniform.

Their duals are respectively the small ditrigonal dodecacronic hexecontahedron and great ditrigonal dodecacronic hexecontahedron.

See also
Small complex icosidodecahedron
Great complex icosidodecahedron

References

Notes

Bibliography
Coxeter, H.S.M., M.S. Longuet-Higgins and J.C.P Miller, Uniform Polyhedra, Phil. Trans. 246 A (1954) pp. 401–450.
 Har'El, Z. Uniform Solution for Uniform Polyhedra., Geometriae Dedicata 47, 57–110, 1993. Zvi Har’El, Kaleido software, Images, dual images

Further reading
Johnson, N.; The Theory of Uniform Polytopes and Honeycombs, Ph.D. Dissertation, University of Toronto, 1966 

Polyhedra